Simon II de Montfort (Montfort l'Amaury, Ile de France, France – 25 September 1104) was the son of Simon I de Montfort (c. 1025–1087) and Agnès d'Évreux (c. 1030–c. 1087).

He succeeded his brother Richard de Montfort in 1092 as lord of Montfort-l'Amaury. In 1098, he had to sustain a siege led by William II Rufus, King of England and guardian of Normandy in the absence of Robert Curthose, gone to crusade, and Simon successfully fought it off.
He died without an heir and left Montfort to his brother, Amaury III.

References

Simon 02
1060s births
1104 deaths
11th-century French people
12th-century French people
People from Yvelines
Seigneur of Montfort
William II of England